McLean Peak is a peak,  high, surmounting a spur descending from the northwest end of Stanford Plateau, along the Watson Escarpment, in Antarctica. It was mapped by the United States Geological Survey from ground surveys and U.S. Navy air photos, 1960–63, and was named by the Advisory Committee on Antarctic Names for Lieutenant William E. McLean, U.S. Navy, medical officer and officer in charge of the South Pole Station winter party in 1964.

References

External links

Mountains of Marie Byrd Land